Content management systems (CMS) are used to organize and facilitate collaborative content creation. Many of them are built on top of separate content management frameworks. The list is limited to notable services.

Open source software  
This section lists free and  open-source software that can be installed and managed on a web server.

Systems listed on a light purple background are no longer in active development.

Java

Java packages/bundle

Microsoft ASP.NET

Perl

PHP

Python

Ruby on Rails

ColdFusion Markup Language (CFML)

JavaScript

Others

Software as a service (SaaS) 
This section lists proprietary software that includes software, hosting, and support with a single vendor. This section includes free services.

Proprietary software 
This section lists proprietary software to be installed and managed on a user's own server. This section includes freeware proprietary software.

Systems listed on a light purple background are no longer in active development.

Other content management frameworks
A content management framework (CMF) is a system that facilitates the use of reusable components or customized software for managing Web content. It shares aspects of a Web application framework and a content management system (CMS).

Below is a list of notable systems that claim to be CMFs.

See also 

 Comparison of web frameworks
 Comparison of wiki software
 Comparison of photo gallery software

References

 
 
Content management systems